Elbert George Mathews (November 24, 1910October 31, 1977) was an American diplomat.

Early life
Mathews was born on November 24, 1910, in Troy, New York to parents Samuel Blumenthal and Anna Margare Mathews.

Diplomatic career
Mathews was the United States Vice Consul to Vancouver from 1935 to  1936. He held the same position in Sydney from 1937 to 1940 and Kabul from 1943 to 1946. Mathews was the United States Consul to Calcutta from 1946 to 1947 and the United States Consul General in Istanbul from 1951 to 1952. Mathews was appointed by President Dwight D. Eisenhower to the position of United States Ambassador to Liberia on August 12, 1959. The presentation of his credentials occurred on September 30, 1959. He remained in this position until May 4, 1962. Mathews was appointed by President Lyndon B. Johnson to the position of United States Ambassador to Nigeria on March 10, 1964. The presentation of his credentials occurred on April 11, 1964. He remained in this position until July 26, 1969.

Personal life
Mathews married Naomi Pearl Meffert on August 20, 1934. Mathews at some point resided in California.

Death
Mathews died on October 31, 1977, in Washington, D.C. Mathews was interred at Rock Creek Cemetery in Washington, D.C.

References

1910 births
1977 deaths
American consuls
Burials at Rock Creek Cemetery
People from Troy, New York
Ambassadors of the United States to Liberia
Ambassadors of the United States to Nigeria
20th-century American diplomats